KDJF (93.5 FM) is a radio station licensed to serve Ester, Alaska; however, the station's offices are in Fairbanks, Alaska. Like many other radio stations in the area (such as North Pole's KJNP-FM), its tower is located on Ester Dome. The station is owned by Tor Ingstad Licenses, LLC. It airs a country music format. Programming on KDJF includes the syndicated Rick and Bubba Show on mornings.

The station was assigned the KDJF call letters by the Federal Communications Commission on November 21, 2005.

References

External links
Chet FM Online

DJF
Country radio stations in the United States
Radio stations established in 2008
2008 establishments in Alaska